Río Branco Airport  is an airport serving the town of Río Branco in Cerro Largo Department, Uruguay.

See also

 List of airports in Uruguay
 Transport in Uruguay

References

External links
 HERE Maps - Río Branco
 OpenStreetMap - Río Branco
 OurAirports - Río Branco
 FallingRain - Río Branco
 Skyvector Aeronautical Charts - Río Branco

Airports in Uruguay